Peter Zander (March 30, 1832 – October 12, 1884) was a member of the Wisconsin State Assembly.

Biography
Zander was born on March 30, 1832, in Habbelrath, Prussia. He immigrated to the United States in 1852, settling in Milwaukee, Wisconsin. After spending a short time in Indiana, he returned to Wisconsin and settled in Cross Plains. Zander died on October 12, 1884.

Career
Zander was a member of the Assembly during the 1876 session. In addition, he was a town supervisor of Cross Plains, Wisconsin and a county supervisor of Dane County, Wisconsin. He was a Democrat.

References

External links

German emigrants to the United States
People from Dane County, Wisconsin
Wisconsin city council members
County supervisors in Wisconsin
1832 births
1884 deaths
Burials in Wisconsin
19th-century American politicians
Democratic Party members of the Wisconsin State Assembly